Castellfollit de la Roca is a municipality in the comarca of Garrotxa, in the Province of Girona, Catalonia, Spain. The urban area is bordered by the confluence of the Fluvià and Toronell rivers, between which the town's basalt cliff rises.

The basalt cliff
The basalt crag where the town is situated is over 50 meters (160 feet) high and almost a kilometer long. It was formed by the overlaying of two lava flows.

References

External links

 Official website
 Government data pages 

Municipalities in Garrotxa
Populated places in Garrotxa